The Madison Cougars were a team in the Independent Women's Football League that began their first season of play in 2011. Based in Madison, Wisconsin, home games were played at Breitenbach Stadium on the campus of Middleton High School in nearby Middleton.

Season-By-Season

|-
|2011 || -- || -- || -- || -- || --
|-

External links 
IWFL press release announcing the Cougars' entry

American football teams in Wisconsin
Independent Women's Football League
Sports in Madison, Wisconsin
American football teams established in 2010
American football teams disestablished in 2012
2010 establishments in Wisconsin
2012 disestablishments in Wisconsin
Women in Wisconsin